Francisco Alberto Zepeda González (born 4 October 1969) is a Mexican politician affiliated with the PRI. He served as Deputy of the LXII Legislature of the Mexican Congress representing Colima, and previously served in the Congress of Colima.

References

1969 births
Living people
People from Manzanillo, Colima
Politicians from Colima
Institutional Revolutionary Party politicians
21st-century Mexican politicians
Members of the Congress of Colima
University of Colima alumni
Deputies of the LXII Legislature of Mexico
Members of the Chamber of Deputies (Mexico) for Colima